Roger D. Moore (November 16, 1939 – March 21, 2019) was the 1973 recipient (with Larry Breed and Richard Lathwell) of the Grace Murray Hopper Award from the Association for Computing Machinery (ACM). It was given "for their work in the design and implementation of APL\360, setting new standards in simplicity, efficiency, reliability and response time for interactive systems."

Moore was a cofounder of I. P. Sharp Associates and held a senior position in the company for many years. Before this, he contributed to the SUBALGOL compiler at Stanford University and wrote the ALGOL 60 compiler for the Ferranti-Packard 6000 and the ICT 1900. Along with his work on the programming language APL, he was also instrumental in the development of IPSANET, a private packet switching data network.

At Stanford University
Roger D. Moore was born in Redlands, California. Before graduation, he worked as an operator of the Burroughs 220 computer at Stanford. During this time he provided some support for Larry Breed’s card stunt system. He also spent time studying the Burroughs 220 BALGOL compiler. This resulted in BUTTERFLY which was described by George Forsythe:
Each grader program was written as a BALGOL-language procedure. It was then compiled together with a procedure called BUTTERFLY, written by Moore. The result was a relocatable machine-language procedure, with a mechanism for equating its variables to variables of any BALGOL program, in just the form of the BALGOL compiler’s own machine-language library procedures (SIN, WRITE, READ, etc.).

Forsythe anticipated a problem as described by Bob Braden:BALGOL at Stanford outlived the B220 hardware. In 1962 Stanford contracted with IBM to obtain an IBM 7090 for campus computing. This created great consternation in Forsythe’s office. A significant body of faculty and students was now familiar with BALGOL, and the high compiling speed of the BAC was vital in an academic environment. To subject this community to the production-oriented system software offered by IBM, including a slow Fortran compiler and cumbersome operating system, would have moved academic computing at Stanford backward by several years. To address this problem, in December 1961, Moore was hired by Forsythe to work on the SUBALGOL compiler for the IBM 7090. Braden and Breed were hired soon afterward.

After completion of SUBALGOL, he was hired by Ferranti-Packard to write an ALGOL 60 compiler for the FP6000. This compiler was part of the software package which are included in the sale of the FP6000 to International Computers and Tabulators.

At I. P. Sharp Associates
In December 1964 most employees of Ferranti-Packard's computer group were laid off. Along with six other former FP employees he formed I. P. Sharp Associates. He was vice-president from incorporation to his retirement in 1989.

In 1966 he, Larry Breed and Richard Lathwell began work on the APL\360 interpreter.

Lastly, APL\360 owes much of its superior time-sharing performance to Roger D. Moore, of I.P. Sharp Associates, Toronto, who was principally responsible for the supervisor. Its design has not been described to the extent it deserves. This team received the Grace Murray Hopper Award from the Association for Computing Machinery (ACM). It was given: "For their work in the design and implementation of APL\360, setting new standards in simplicity, efficiency, reliability and response time for interactive systems."

In 1970, Moore became project leader of IPSA's speculative DOS/360 COBOL compiler project. Although the compiler had satisfactory performance, the market did not accept it.

IPSA offered APL time-sharing service starting in 1969. By 1975, the inflexibility and communication error intolerance of time-division multiplexing were no longer tolerable. He became the chief architect of the IPSANET packet switching computer network. In 1976 this system was deployed in North America and London.

In 1984, IPSA released Sharp APL for the IBM PC. This package included a 370 emulator written by Moore.

Retirement
After retiring from IPSA in early 1989, he became interested in opera and chamber music. Along with attending many performances, he has supported concerts, commissions and advanced music education.

Compositions funded 
Moore has funded the composing of many works.
Dean Burry Sword in the Schoolyard (2016)
Xiaoyong Chen Talking through Distance (2014)
John Estacio Away and Awake in the Night (2013)
Larysa Kuzmenko Piano Concerto (2002)
Marjan Mozetich Scales of joy and sorrow (2007)
Michael Oesterle Rambler Rose (2014)
Norbert Palej Cloud Light (2013)
Randolph Peters The Seven Gates of Kur (2000)
Erik Ross Dark (2007)
R. Murray Schafer Trio for Violin, Cello and Piano (2013)
Nick Storring Gardens (2014)

Awards

Publications

References

External links

Mooreiana, Roger Moore Quotations and Anecdotes

American computer scientists
Computer systems researchers
Programming language researchers
I. P. Sharp Associates employees
Grace Murray Hopper Award laureates
1939 births
Stanford University School of Humanities and Sciences alumni
APL implementers
2019 deaths